Rushwick Halt railway station was a station in Rushwick, Worcestershire, England. The station was opened on 31 March 1924 and closed on 5 April 1965.

References

Further reading

Disused railway stations in Worcestershire
Railway stations in Great Britain opened in 1924
Railway stations in Great Britain closed in 1965
Former Great Western Railway stations
Beeching closures in England